Calau is a small town in the Oberspreewald-Lausitz district, in southern Brandenburg, Germany. It is situated 14 km south of Lübbenau, and 27 km west of Cottbus. Calau is also called the home of the Kalauer.

Geography 
The Town of Calau is situated in the middle of Lower Lusatia, about 27 km west of Cottbus at the eastern edge of the Lower Lusatian Ridge Nature Park as well as at the southern edge of the famous Spree Forest.

The area around Calau is strongly characterized by former lignite mining sites, which are valuable retreat areas for animals and plants nowadays. Many places are left to nature after recultivation, The Heinz Sielmann Foundation adopted numerous areas, others are managed near-natural and sustainably by the state forest administration. Foresters offer walking tours through the region. Particularly the "Geologische und Naturlehrpfad Luttchensberg" is a sight to see.

Town subdivisions 
 Stadt Calau
 Ortsteil Bolschwitz
 Ortsteil Buckow
 Ortsteil Craupe with Radensdorf and Schrakau
 Ortsteil Gollmitz with Settinchen
 Ortsteil Groß Jehser with Erpitz and Mallenchen
 Ortsteil Groß-Mehßow with Klein Mehßow
 Ortsteil Kemmen with Säritz und Schadewitz
 Ortsteil Mlode with Rochusthal
 Ortsteil Saßleben with Kalkwitz and Reuden
 Ortsteil Werchow with Cabel (Village) and Plieskendorf
 Ortsteil Zinnitz with Bathow (Village)
 Zinnitz has about 300 residents. It was first mentioned in 1255 as Cinnicz. The Name means Ort wo Rohr/Schilf wächst (Place where cane/reed is growing). Known citizen of Zinnitz is Dietrich III. von Bocksdorf, bishop of Naumburg from 1463 to 1466.

History 
From 1815 to 1947, Calau was part of the Prussian Province of Brandenburg.

From 1952 to 1990, it was part of the Bezirk Cottbus of East Germany.

Population 
There are only a few people with Sorbian roots living in Calau today, although the Sorbs were quite a large minority in 1843 with about 30.8 percent of the overall population. In following years the number of Sorbs decreased rapidly, and in 1900 only 3.5 percent of the population were Sorbs.

Demography

Politics

Mayor 
Werner Suchner (independent) was elected in 2009 with 55,3 % of the vote.

Municipal Assembly 
The municipal assembly (Stadtverordnetenversammlung) consists of 18 "Stadtverordneten" plus the "Buergermeister" (town mayor).
 The Left: 6 seats
 Christian Democratic Union: 4 seats
 Social Democratic Party of Germany: 3 seats
 Free Voters: 2 seats
 Alliance '90/The Greens: 1 seats
 Free Democratic Party: 1 seat
 German Social Union: 1 seat
(Stand: Kommunalwahl am 28. September 2008)

International relations 
  Viersen, Germany
  Valdivia, Chile

Historical sites 

 Memorial at the Karl-Marx-Straße/Ecke Parkstraße, 1928 initially dedicated to the first President of Germany, Friedrich Ebert, destroyed by the Nazis in 1933, to be dedicated to the victims of Nazism in 1948, rededicated again in 1989 to the victims of Fascism and Stalinism
 Memorial for actor Joachim Gottschalk. When his Jewish wife Meta and son Michael were to be deported, the whole family decided to commit suicide on November 6, 1941. The bronze figure, which was created by Theo Balden in 1967, resembles the actor. It was initially located in a park but had to be moved due to the building of the local Sparkasse in the 1990s. Its new place is a memorial wall in the Joachim-Gottschalk-Straße 35.

Economy and infrastructure 
The transmitter station Calau, which belongs to the Deutsche Telekom radiates a variety of VHF-and TV-programmes of the rbb for Brandenburg. Its radio mast is a reinforced concrete tower of 190 m height, the so-called "Langer Calauer", in the southwest of town. It was built in 1982.

Traffic 

There are no Bundesstraßen going through Calau, the motorway junction Calau is seven km to the northwest at the A 13.

Calau is situated at the railroad lines Cottbus–Leipzig and Lübbenau–Senftenberg.

Edification

Schools 
 Primary school Calau, named Carl-Anwandter-Grundschule since 2008
 Comprehensive school, named Robert-Schlesier-Schule since 2007
 Academic high school, named Carl-Anwandter-Gymnasium Calau (closed since 2008)

Personalities 
 Dietrich von Bocksdorf (b. 1410 in Zinnitz – 1466 in Naumburg), bishop of Naumburg
 Valentin Naboth (1523–1593) mathematician, astronomer and astrologer
 Martin Naboth (1675–1721), doctor

 Carl Anwandter (1801–1889), stands out as leader of the first contingent of German colonists sent by Philippi; Anwandter is also founder of the German school Valdivia (Chile)
 Ernst Dohm (1819–1883), editor and writer, helped the pun in his journal Kladderadatsch to regional awareness
 Erasmus Robert Freiherr von Patow (1804–1890), Prussian politician
 Joachim Gottschalk (1904–1941), stage and film actor
 Sebatian Wolf (1989), artist

References 

Bibliography
 Richard Moderhack: Die ältere Geschichte der Stadt Calau in der Niederlausitz, Dissertation 1932

External links 

  
 Website about the Carl-Anwandter-Gymnasium
 Website Groß Mehßow
 Website Reuden

Populated places in Oberspreewald-Lausitz